Infinite Justice is a 2006 British thriller drama film written and directed by London-based Pakistani director Jamil Dehlavi. It won Best Dramatic Feature at the European Independent Awards in Paris in March 2007, and the Robert Rodriguez Award for Excellence at the 2007 Hollywood Digital Film Festival in Los Angeles. It opened in theaters in the United Kingdom on 30 November 2007. The plot revolves around Muslim fundamentalists taking an American reporter hostage during the U.S. Infinite Justice efforts in Afghanistan.

Cast
 Kevin Collins as Arnold Silverman 
 Raza Jaffrey as Kamal Khan 
 Jennifer Calvert as Sarah 
 Constantine Gregory as Abe Kautsky 
 Jeff Mirza as Inspector Akhtar 
 Ivana Basic as Salima
 Renu Setna as Masood

References

External links 
 
 
Official site

2006 thriller drama films
2006 films
British thriller drama films
2006 drama films
2000s English-language films
2000s British films